Diefenbach is a surname. Notable people with the surname include:

Jasper Diefenbach (born 1988), Dutch volleyball player
Karl Wilhelm Diefenbach (1851–1913), German painter and social reformer
Lorenz Diefenbach (1806–1883), German philologist and lexicographer

See also
Dieffenbach (surname)
Dieffenbach (disambiguation)